Etlingera littoralis is a plant in the family Zingiberaceae (gingers), with no subspecies listed in the Catalogue of Life.  It is found in lowland tropical forest floors (up to 300 m) in: Hainan, Indo-China and Malesia.

References

External links 

littoralis
Flora of Indo-China
Flora of Malesia